The governor of Ohio is the head of government of Ohio and the commander-in-chief of the U.S. state's military forces. The officeholder has a duty to enforce state laws, the power to either approve or veto bills passed by the Ohio General Assembly, the power to convene the legislature and the power to grant pardons, except in cases of treason and impeachment.

There have been 64 governors of Ohio, serving 70 distinct terms. The longest term was held by Jim Rhodes, who was elected four times and served just under sixteen years in two non-consecutive periods of two terms each (1963–1971 and 1975–1983). The shortest terms were held by John William Brown and Nancy Hollister, who each served for only 11 days after the governors preceding them resigned in order to begin the terms to which they had been elected in the United States Senate; the shortest-serving elected governor was John M. Pattison, who died in office five months into his term. The current governor is Republican Mike DeWine, who took office on January 14, 2019.

Qualifications
 
To become governor of Ohio, a candidate must be a qualified elector in the state. This means that any candidate for governor must be at least 18 years old at the time of election, a resident of Ohio for at least 30 days before the election, and a U.S. citizen. Convicted felons and those deemed by the courts as incompetent to vote are not eligible. There is a term limit of two consecutive terms as governor.

Powers
The governor is the commander-in-chief of the state's military forces. The governor has a duty to enforce state laws; the power to either approve or veto bills passed by the Ohio State Legislature; the power to convene the legislature; and the power to grant pardons, except in cases of treason and impeachment.

Other duties and privileges of the office include:

 Executing all laws and requiring written information on any office from the head of that office  
 Making an annual address to the General Assembly, with recommendation for legislation  
 Convening extraordinary sessions of the legislature with limited purposes  
 Adjourning the legislature when the two chambers cannot agree to do so themselves, not to include the privilege of adjourning the legislature past the sine die set for the regular session  
 Keeping and using "The Great Seal of the State of Ohio"  
 Signing and sealing all commissions granted in the name of the state of Ohio  
 Nominating, in the event of a vacancy in the Lieutenant Governor's office, a new officer, subject to a confirmatory vote of both chambers of the legislature  
 Making vacancy appointments for all "key state officers" (the Auditor, the Treasurer, the Secretary of State, and the Attorney General. Such appointments are for the remainder of the term when the next general election is less than 40 days away and until the next general election otherwise  
 Accepting a report from the head of each executive department at least once a year, not later than five days before the regular session of the legislature convenes, and including the substance of those reports in the annual address to the legislature  
 Making all appointments not otherwise provided for, with the advice and consent of the Senate, unless the Senate refuses to act, in which case the Governor's appointee takes offices by default

Succession

Should the office of governor become vacant due to death, resignation, or conviction of impeachment, the lieutenant governor assumes the title of governor. Should the office of lieutenant governor also become vacant, the president of the senate becomes the acting governor. If the vacancy of both offices took place during the first twenty months of the term, a special election is to be held on the next even-numbered year to elect new officers to serve out the current term. Prior to 1851, the speaker of the senate acted as governor for the term. Since 1978, the governor and lieutenant governor have been elected on the same ticket; prior to then, they could be (and often were) members of different parties.

Governors

Governors of Northwest Territory
Initially after the American Revolution, parts of the area now known as Ohio were claimed by New York, Virginia, and Connecticut; however, New York ceded its claim in 1782, Virginia in 1784, and Connecticut in 1786, though it maintained its Western Reserve in the area until 1800. On July 13, 1787, the Northwest Territory was formed. As territories were split from it, one of them eventually came to represent the area of present-day Ohio.

Throughout its 15-year history, Northwest Territory had only one governor, Arthur St. Clair. He was removed from office by President Thomas Jefferson on November 22, 1802, and no successor was named; Charles Willing Byrd, as Secretary of the Territory, acted as governor until statehood.

Governors of the State of Ohio

Ohio was admitted to the Union on March 1, 1803. Since then, it has had 64 governors, six of whom (Allen Trimble, Wilson Shannon, Rutherford B. Hayes, James M. Cox, Frank Lausche, and Jim Rhodes) served non-consecutive terms.

The first constitution of 1803 allowed governors to serve for two three-year terms, limited to six of any eight years, commencing on the first Monday in the December following an election. The current constitution of 1851 removed the term limit, and shifted the start of the term to the second Monday in January following an election. In 1908, Ohio switched from holding elections in odd-numbered years to even-numbered years, with the preceding governor (from the 1905 election) serving an extra year. A 1957 amendment lengthened the term to four years and allowed governors to only succeed themselves once, having to wait four years after their second term in a row before being allowed to run again. An Ohio Supreme Court ruling in 1973 clarified this to mean governors could theoretically serve unlimited terms, as long as they waited four years after every second term.

Notes

See also

 Ohio gubernatorial elections
 List of Ohio state legislatures

References

General

Constitutions

Specific

External links

Office of the Governor of Ohio

Lists of state governors of the United States

Lists of Ohio politicians